Mary Otis Stevens (born 1928) is an American architect in Cambridge, Massachusetts. The MIT Museum describes her as "one of the most important female architects in the Northeast during the 1960s and 1970s."

Early life and education
Born in New York City to an affluent family descended from leading figures in the American Revolution, Stevens attended Smith College, where she received a degree in philosophy in 1949. She was active in the civil rights movement during her undergraduate years, presaging a lifelong commitment to social and civic activism. In 1950, she married William Vaughn Moody Fawcett. Stevens entered the architecture program at MIT in 1953, graduating with an SBArch in 1956. Influences at MIT included Alvar Aalto, Eero Saarinen, Kevin Lynch, and Buckminster Fuller, who was also a family friend. Other influences included the historian Samuel Eliot Morison, a relative and father figure.

Work 
Stevens worked for The Architects' Collaborative (TAC) before launching a practice with MIT faculty member Thomas McNulty in 1956, whom she married after her 1958 divorce. Stevens and McNulty practiced together until 1969, when they founded i Press Inc., a publisher of books on architecture and urban theory, which Stevens directed until its dissolution in 1978. Stevens also founded Design Guild in 1975, a collaborative architecture practice focusing on adaptive reuse and sustainability.

Significant projects 

Stevens is best known for the Lincoln House (1965), which she designed with Tom McNulty for their own family on a rural site in Lincoln, Massachusetts, a suburb of Boston. The curvilinear concrete structure, which is often called the first exposed-concrete and glass house in the United States, won international attention. Stevens lived in the house until 1978, when she and McNulty sold it to Sarah Caldwell, the renowned opera director. Stevens and McNulty divorced soon after. The house was widely published, but was demolished in 2001 after Caldwell sold the property.

Other significant work 
Milan Triennial XIV, 1968 (with McNulty and Gyorgy Kepes)
Torf House, Weston, Massachusetts
Wolf Trap Performing Arts Center, Vienna, Virginia (1980s)
World of Variation, Mary Otis Stevens and Thomas F. McNulty, G. Braziler, 1970.

Stevens was also featured in Season 9 (1987) of the television series This Old House for her work on the Benjamin Weatherbee House built in 1785 (Westwood, Massachusetts).

Later life 
After the death of Jesse Fillman in 1991, a lawyer whom she married in 1978, Stevens disbanded Design Guild to pursue studies in music composition at Longy School of Music. In 2007, she donated her archives to MIT.

Further reading 
 Interview in Domus: http://www.domusweb.it/en/architecture/2013/04/17/the_flux_of_humanlife.html
 Jane McGroarty and Susana Torre "New Professional Identities: Four Women in the Sixties" in Women in American Architecture: A Historic and Contemporary Perspective, edited by Susana Torre (Whitney Library of Design, 1977) (Also includes essay by Stevens).
 "Building Utopia: Mary Otis Stevens and the Lincoln, Massachusetts, House" by Susanna Torre in Impossible to Hold: Women and Culture in the 1960s, edited by Avital H. Bloch and Lauri Umansky. http://www.susanatorre.net/wp-content/uploads/Building-Utopia.pdf
 "Her Design Is to Save the Earth" by Laura Van Tuyl, The Christian Science Monitor, January 28, 1991. http://www.csmonitor.com/1991/0128/parchi.html
 D. C. Hillier  (December 10, 2015).  The Lincoln House: A Lost Beton Brut.  MCM Daily.
 Cole, Doris (1973). From Tipi to Skyscraper: A history of women in architecture. Boston, Massachusetts: i press incorporated. , .

References 

20th-century American architects
Smith College alumni
MIT School of Architecture and Planning alumni
1928 births
Living people
People from Lincoln, Massachusetts
21st-century American architects
Architects from New York City